Mark Mackay (born September 25, 1978) is an Aruban football player. He has played for Aruba national team.

National team statistics

References

1978 births
Living people
Aruban footballers
Association football midfielders
SV Racing Club Aruba players
S.V. Transvaal players
SV Britannia players
Aruban Division di Honor players
SVB Eerste Divisie players
Expatriate footballers in Suriname
Aruba international footballers